Subramanya is a village located in Kadaba Taluk in Dakshina Kannada, India. The Kukke Subrahmanya Temple is located here. It was originally named "Kukke Pattana".

Pilgrim centre

The village is an approach and resting point for pilgrims visiting the Kukke Subrahmanya Temple in Subrahmanya. The village is surrounded by the Kumaradhara River. The Darpana Theertha, a tributary of the Kumaradhara, flows just behind the temple.

The belief is that Vasuki and other snakes took refuge under the god Subrahmanya in the caves at Subramanya.  Here Subrahmanya is worshipped as a snake.

Legend

According to one myth, after killing the demon rulers, Tharaka and Shura Padmasura, and their followers in a war, Lord Shanmukha reached Kumara parvatha with his brother Ganesha and others. He was received by Indra and his followers. Indra, being very happy, prayed for Lord Kumara swamy to accept and marry his daughter Devasena, to which the Lord readily agreed. The divine marriage took place on Margashira shudha shashti at Kumara parvatha. Gods like Brahma, Vishnu, Rudra and many other deities assembled for the marriage and coronation ceremony of Shanmukha, for which waters of several holy rivers were brought. With these, waters of Mahabhisheka fell down to form a river which was later known by the popular name Kumaradhara.

The Shiva Bhakta and serpent king Vasuki were performing tapas for years in the Biladwara Caves of Kukke Subrahmanya to avoid the attack of Garuda. Following Lord Shiva's assurance, Shanmukha gave darshan to Vasuki and blessed him that he would stay with his parama bhakta in this place forever. Hence the poojas offered to Vasuki or Nagaraja are nothing but the poojas to Lord Subrahmanya.

Madhvacharya has also visited this place, and founded one mutt there.
The speciality of Kukke Subrahmanya Matha lies in the fact that the powerful Samputa is present here. When Jagadguru Sri Madhwacharya had gone to the Himalayas to write commentaries on the Hindu Scripture under the guidance of the great Sri Ved Vyas, Ved Vyas had given him 8 Vyasa Mushti Saligrams. Sri Madhwacharya took 5 of these along with 144 Lakshmi Narayana Saligrams and 1 Lakshmi Narasimha Saligram and put them inside a Samputa. It is this Samputa that eventually became known as the Narasimha Samputa. It is said that Sri Madhwacharya adored this Samputa so much so that the scriptures called this Samputa as Sri Madhwacharya's heart. When Sri Aniruddha Theertharu was serving as the first pontiff of this Matha, the then king (of the local area) Ballalraaya tried to break open the Samputa by placing it under an elephant's feet. Instead of the Samputa breaking open, the elephant died on the spot. The apologetic and regretful King realized his mistake and donated his monetary possessions to the Matha. Sri Madhwacharya gave Sanyasa Initiation to Sri Vishnu Theertharu (his brother) and made him the head of the Matha. Sri Vishnu Theertharu left behind the Samputa Narasimha, Vyaasa Mushti, Vithala and Rukmini and Satyabhama, and a smiling Lakshmi Narasimha to the Matha. Many people believe that Sri Vishnu Theertharu is still performing prayers and penance in the Siddha Parvatha since no one has been successful in finding his brindavana. It is also said that initially, Sri Vishnu Theertharu had carried the Samputa with him, but ended up sending it back to the Matha via the Kumara Dhaara River at the request of Sri Aniruddha Theertharu.

Places to visit

Shree Subrahmanya: Lord Subrahmanya Swamy / Subrahmaneshwara is the main deity of Subrahmanya. Originally Lord Subrahmanya was being worshipped as Kukke Linga / Ahipeshwara Linga which was situated at the main sanctum. As per "shankara Digvijaya" Shri Adi shankaracharya Visited the shrine and praised the Lord subrahmanya  as "Bhaje kukke Lingam" by composing the poem "Subrahmanya Bhujanga Prayatam"
Kukke Linga: Originally Lord Subrahmanyeswara was being worshipped as Kukke Linga / Ahipeshwara Linga which was situated at the main sanctum. Nowadays  a cluster of lingas placed to the west of the inner sanctum, is worshipped as Kukke Lingas.
Sri Subrahmanya Mutt: This mutt belonging to the Dwaitha tradition is situated to the south east of outer quadrangle of the Temple. It is believed that Sri Madwacharya made his brother, Vishnuteerthacharya, his disciple and gave this mutt. The present sri of this mutt is Sri Sri Sri Vidyaprasanna Theertha Swamiji. Kukke Sri Abhaya Ganapathi Temple, Sri Vanadurga Devi Temple, Somanatha Temple and Samputa Narasimha Temple are also managed by this mutt. 
Kala Bairava: The shrine of Lord Bairava is situated at the southern side of the inner sanctum.
Umamaheshwara: This image can be found in the northeastern side of the main sanctum. The images of Soorya, Ambika, Vishnu and Ganapathi are also found here.
Hosoligamma: The shrine of Hosoligamma lies to the southern side of the main sanctum. The images of Soorya, Ambika, Vishnu and Ganapathi are also found here.
Ballalaraya Vigraha: This statue of Ballala King can be found when entering the main temple.
Uttaradi Mutt: This mutt is situated on the northern side of the car street.
Adi Subrahmanya: A road on the northern side of the main Gopuram leads to Adi Subrahmanya. A  walk will take you to Adi Subrahmanya temple. One can see a valmika (anthill) in the sanctum where daily poojas are conducted.
Here temples of Ganapathi and Anjaneya are seen.
It is said that Vasuki (Serpent king) lay hiding in this cave to escape from Garude. It is a cave surrounded by a garden.
Kumaradhara river (Bathing Ghat): The river originates from Kumaraparvatha. It flows into the Nethravathi, a river of Dakshina Kannada district, and joins the Arabian Sea. As the river flows over the rocks and thick forest areas it is believed to have medicinal powers to cure skin diseases.
Darpana Theertha: This tributary of the Kumaradhara flows in front of the outer quadrangle of the main temple. It is believed that a mirror (Darpana) and an Akshaya patra (Kopparige with full of gold jewels) happened to come floating down from mountain and the same was collected by temple authorities.
It was recently renovated by using specially designed red stones on traditional style. Daily poojas are conducted here and devotees offer sevas to a goddess.
It is one of the biggest monolithic statues of Ganapa. The architecture of the shrine is in Nepali style.
Somanatha Temple Agrahara: This ancient temple, also called Panchami Theertha, is situated on the left bank of the Kumaradhara. In this place, swamijis of Shree Subrahmanya Mutt are entombed. About 16 tombs of swamijis are found here.
An idol of Basava is kept here.
It is the abode of both Vishnu (Hari) and Shiva (Hara). A panoramic view of the Western Ghat can be seen if you stand in front of this temple.

Other places
Garden near Adi Subrahmanya temple: A  walk will take you to a garden maintained by the temple, which is located on the right bank of the Darpana Theertha river.
Garden near Biladwara: Visitors can reach this garden by walking from the temple. It is an ancient cave surrounded by a garden.
Mathsya Gundi (Yenekal): About  from the main temple, in Yenekal village, there is a spot where fish live in large numbers, including large  / tiger fish.
Research station: Central Plantation Crops Research Institute (CPCRI), Kidu. CPCRI was founded in 1972 with an aim to produce genetically superior planting materials of coconut, areca nut and cocoa. It is both a seed farm and research centre. The farm has  of land.

Trekking
There are two routes from where you can trek to this Kumara Parvata (Pushpagiri): one is from Subramanya, and another is from Somwarpet.

The Green Route is a segment along the Bangalore and Mangalore railway line in India, within a pristine part of the Western Ghat mountain ranges often called a trekker's paradise. This segment on the railway track from Sakaleshpura to the Kukke Subramanya Road station features dense green forest.

Transportation

Kukke Subrahmanya can be reached by road from Mangalore, Bangalore, Dharmasthala, Mysore, Puttur etc. The route from Bangalore is connected from Hassan via Sakleshpur Ghat section. There is another route to reach Kukke Subrahmanya via Bisle Ghat section which is through Bisle Reserve Forest. It is a less used route,SH-85 & SH-8, known for Bike riding and photography. KSRTC operates buses on a daily basis from these and other places. There are passenger, express train services, connecting Subramanya to Mangaluru, Bengaluru, Mysuru, Hubballi, Kannur and Karwar. Train with Vistadome coach has also been introduced.

See also 
Sullia
Puttur
Mangalore

References

External links 
 "Kukke Subrahmanya Temple" by Mangalore.com 
 "Subrahmanya" by Templenet.com 
 "Kukke Temple" 
Visit Kukke Subramanya Temple Website

Villages in Dakshina Kannada district